Carolin Kebekus (born 9 May 1980) is a German comedian and television personality.

Biography 
Born in Bergisch Gladbach, Kebekus grew up as daughter of a social education worker and a banker in Köln-Ostheim. Her younger Brother David Kebe is also a comedian. She started her career as an intern at Freitag Nacht News, a weekly comedy show. One of the co-producers of the show, Hugo Egon Balder, saw her talent in acting and arranged for her to take acting classes parallel to her internship. In 2002, she did an internship at 1 Live.

Her parodies of the frontsinger Bill Kaulitz of the band Tokio Hotel in the Freitag Nacht News were the catalysts of her breakthrough. However, in 2006 she also faced big backlash from the fan-community of Tokio Hotel and received hateful messages and threats. From September 2006 until the show was cancelled in December 2006, Kebekus was one of the hosts of Freitag Nacht News together with Ingo Appelt and others.

Kebekus works as a comedian and television actress on German broadcasters. The content of her comedy is highly feminist and satirical.

In an interview with the Kölner Stadt-Anzeiger on 9 March 2022, Kebekus said that she had left the Roman Catholic Church, but continued to consider herself Catholic. "As a baptized person, no one can take that away from me or deny it. I have problems with the institution, its structures and power relations. That's why I left the church. But I feel that I belong to the community of believers."

Controversy 

In February 2013, the heute-show transmitted a satirical film clip, in which Kebekus advertised as Pope by cardinal Joachim Meisner. According to the Spiegel a spokesman of the German bishops' conference tried in vain to stop the broadcasting of the episode.
In June 2013, the WDR decided against broadcasting the satirical video "Dunk den Herrn! Kebekus!" (in Englisch: dunk the lord! Kebekus!) produced by Kebekus on Einsfestival. In the video, in which she is wearing a nun's costume and licking on a crucifix, Kebekus, among other things, rapped (approximate translation): "He is my bank, only for him I go naked" and "With God, the punk goes off because only He has the funk; Jesus is the shit and if you don't believe that, you're shit". There were also made allusions on sexual abuse in the Catholic Church. Stefan Raab recommended Kebekus to complain to the future WDR director Tom Buhrow and to insist on the freedom of art, after she has described their program as "mutilated": "It had, of course, been on the wane for about three weeks, but now it struck WDR: 'We don't want to be that young either'". It would probably also remain the last broadcast.
Regarding the accusation of censorship made by Kebekus in TV total, and the accusation of self-censorship, which was according to the Tagesspiegel, made by employees of the show, the WDR explained, it could not "be accepted in such a way". The TV channel represents liberality and tolerance, which means that religious beliefs of the population must be respected.
After editorial discussions and juridical examination, the responsibles of the program had therefore decided not to broadcast the video: "There is a huge difference between critics on the institution of the church and the denigration of religious symbols", regardless of whether a show straightens a younger or an older audience. Whether there will be a future working together with Kebekus will be seen – "our doors remain open anyway." In correlation with the video, 100 complaints against Kebekus were received, due to a call of the Society of Saint Pius X.
The prosecution in Cologne examined, if the clip fulfilled the offence of insulting confessions, religious societies and ideological associations (paragraphe 166 StGB) but could not determine criminally relevant action and consequently stopped investigations. The satirical exaggerated representation does not have an abusive character but criticizes content of the church.
The book written by Kebekus in 2021, Es kann nur eine geben (in english: There can only be one), not only met with approval, but also with criticism. Fabiola Gerpott and Ralf Landwehr, for example, point out that in this book Kebekus put too much "responsibility on women and played down systemic causes". This would shift "the focus of perception in a counterproductive way".

Filmography 

 2006: Freitag Nacht News
 2006: Pastewka – Der Gutschein
 2007: Vollidiot
 2007: Kinder, Kinder
 2007: Sag es mit Pantoffeln
 2008: Morgen, ihr Luschen! Der Ausbilder-Schmidt-Film
 2008: Die einzig wahren Hochzeitscrasher
 2008: WunderBar
 2009–2011: Broken Comedy
 2011: Die Wochenshow
 2012: Hanni & Nanni 2
 2012: Agent Ranjid rettet die Welt
 2012: Die ProSieben Märchenstunde
 2013: Ritter Rost – Eisenhart & voll verbeult
 2013: TV total Prunksitzung
 since 2013: heute-show
 2013: Kebekus!
 2013: Durchgedreht!
 2013: Eye TV – Der durchgeknallte Puppensender
 2014: Therapy Crashers
 2014: Mario Barth deckt auf!
 2015–2019: PussyTerror TV
 2020: Die Carolin Kebekus Show
 2021: LOL: Last One Laughing

Awards 
 2013: Deutscher Comedypreis as Best Comedian
 2014: Deutscher Comedypreis as Best Comedian

References

External links 

 Official website
 interview with Carolin Kebekus on hiphop.tv

German women comedians
German television actresses
German feminists
German satirists
1980 births
Living people
German Roman Catholics
Critics of the Catholic Church
Catholic feminists
People from Bergisch Gladbach
RTL Group people